Ivan Lendl was the defending champion but lost in the final 6–2, 4–6, 6–3, 6–7, 7–6 to John McEnroe.

Seeds
A champion seed is indicated in bold text while text in italics indicates the round in which that seed was eliminated.

  Ivan Lendl (final)
  John McEnroe (champion)
  Guillermo Vilas (quarterfinals)
  Kevin Curren (quarterfinals)

Draw

References

External links
 1983 World Championship Tennis Finals draw

Singles